Ulisse  is an opera in a prologue and two acts composed by Luigi Dallapiccola to his own libretto based on the legend of Ulysses. It premiered at the Deutsche Oper Berlin (in German translation by Karl-Heinrich Kreith as Odysseus) on 29 September 1968 conducted by Lorin Maazel with Erik Saedén in the title role. Ulisse was Dallapiccola's last opera and took eight years to compose. As in his previous operas, Volo di notte and Il prigioniero, his declared theme was "the struggle of man against some force much stronger than he".

Roles
Ulisse – baritone (Erik Saedén)
Calypso – soprano (Annabelle Bernard)
Nausicaa – soprano (Catherine Gayer)
Re Alcinoo – bass (Victor von Halem)
 Demodoco – tenor (Helmuth Melchert)
Circe – mezzo-soprano (Jean Madeira)
La madre di Anticlea ("mother of Anticlea") – soprano (Hildegard Hillebrecht)
Tiresia – tenor (Helmuth Melchert)
Pisandro (a suitor) – baritone (José van Dam)
Antinoo – baritone (Ernst Krukowski)
Eurimaco – tenor (Karl Ernst Mercker)
Melanto – mezzo-soprano (Jean Madeira)
Eumeo – tenor (Loren Driscoll)
Telemaco – contralto (Barbara Scherler)
Penelope – soprano (Annabelle Bernard)
Ancella 1 ("handmaid 1") – soprano (Gitta Mikes)
Ancella 2 ("handmaid 2") – contralto (Helga Wisniewaska)

Notes and references

Sources
Gelli, Piero (ed.), "Ulisse", Dizionario dell'Opera, Baldini Castoldi Dalai, 2007, . Accessed online 16 March 2009
Shirley, Wayne, Luigi Dallapiccola's Sketch for Ulisse, The Moldenhauer Archives, Library of Congress
Warrack, John and West, Ewan, "Dallapiccola, Luigi", The Concise Oxford Dictionary of Opera, 1996.

External links

Operas by Luigi Dallapiccola
Italian-language operas
1968 operas
Operas
Operas based on classical mythology
Operas based on the Odyssey